Advisor's Edge is a Canadian magazine for client-facing financial advisors that is published by Transcontinental Media.

In 2016, Advisor's Edge published six issues. Advisor.ca is updated each business day.

History and profile 
Advisor's Edge was founded in June 1998 by Maclean Hunter Publishing, which was part of Rogers Media, a subsidiary of Rogers Communications Inc. In September 2016, Rogers Media announced it was divesting all its business-to-business publications. On December 1, 2016, Advisor's Edge was acquired by Transcontinental Media.

The readership of Advisor's Edge includes more than 33,500 client-facing investment and financial advisors. Conseiller, sister magazine of Advisor's Edge, reaches francophone financial advisors in Quebec. Conseiller was started in 2000.

Awards 
Advisor's Edge has won the following recent awards:
 Chartered Financial Analyst (CFA) Society Toronto Publication of the Year (2017)
 CFA Society Toronto Spirit of the Future of Finance Award (2017)
 Portfolio Management Association of Canada Award for Excellence in Investment Journalism (2017)
 Gold, Best In-House Cover, Canadian Business Media Awards (2016)
 Silver, Best Professional Article, Canadian Business Media Awards (2016)

References 

Trade magazines published in Canada
Transcontinental Media publications